NCS may refer to:

Biology and chemistry 
 N-Chlorosuccinimide, an organic chemical
 Neotenic complex syndrome
 Nerve conduction study, a medical diagnostic test
 Neuronal calcium sensor, a family of proteins
 Thiocyanate, an organic compound in the cyanate family

Computers and technology 
 Network Computing System, an implementation of the Network Computing Architecture at Apollo Computer
 Network-based Call Signaling, a protocol used with VoIP
 Networked control system

Geography 
 Norwegian continental shelf, the continental shelf of Norway

Organizations 
 National Cartoonists Society, US
 National Center for Simulation, US defense technologies association
 National Children's Study, US cohort study
 National Citizen Service, voluntary service for 16-17-year-olds in England
 National Clandestine Service, later Directorate of Operations (CIA), US
 National Crime Squad, a former British police organisation
 National Communications System, a former US agency
 National Compensation Survey, US
 National Convenience Stores, a US company
 Naval Canteen Service, the Royal Navy branch of the NAAFI
 NCS Group, formerly National Computer Systems, Singapore
 North Carolina Symphony, based in Raleigh, North Carolina
 North Coast Section, an athletic organization in California, US
 Nippon Computer Systems
 NoCopyrightSounds, a British record label

Schools and universities 
 National Cathedral School in Washington, D.C.
 National Cryptologic School, of the U.S. National Security Agency 
 Navy Children School, India
 Newark Charter School in Newark, Delaware, US
 Newham Collegiate Sixth Form Centre in London, England
 Northland Christian School in Houston, Texas, US
 North Cestrian School in Altrincham, Greater Manchester, England

Social care 

 National Care Service, proposed social care service in the United Kingdom

Standards 
 National CAD Standard, US
 NATO Codification System, for items of supply
 Natural Color System, a proprietary color model

Television 
 NCS: Manhunt, a British crime drama series from 2001-2002

Transport 
 Newark City Subway, New Jersey, US
 North Central Service, a rail line in Chicago, Illinois, US